The 1962–63 Yorkshire Football League was the 37th season in the history of the Yorkshire Football League, a football competition in England.

Division One

Division One featured 12 clubs which competed in the previous season, along with four new clubs, promoted from Division Two:
Bridlington Trinity
Doncaster United
Hatfield Main
Swallownest Miners Welfare

League table

Map

Division Two

Division Two featured ten clubs which competed in the previous season, along with five new clubs.
Clubs relegated from Division One:
Frickley Colliery reserves
Ossett Town
Swillington Miners Welfare
Plus:
Dodworth Miners Welfare
Mexborough Town, new club

Also, Brodsworth Main Colliery changed name to Brodsworth Main.

League table

Map

References

1962–63 in English football leagues
Yorkshire Football League